The Ardsley Country Club or Ardsley Club is a country club in the United States. It was founded in August 1895 to "cater to industrialists" such as Amzi Barber, J. P. Morgan, the Rockefeller brothers, and Cornelius Vanderbilt II.

History

Original development
In 1892, Amzi L. Barber bought the property known as "Ardsley Towers" in Irvington, New York. The property was built by Cyrus W. Field for his son, whose financial difficulties made a sale of the property necessary. Barber developed the  property into Ardsley Park and Ardsley Country Club. Barber, a real-estate developer, had the idea that the homes he developed in Ardsley Park would be purchased by members of a neighboring country club. According to The New York Times, "this sense of symbiotic interchange between the residents of the surrounding community and the club helped create a cozy, if undeniably exclusionary, enclave."

The Ardsley Country Club was founded in August 1895 to cater to industrialists. Original members included Amzi Barber, William and John D. Rockefeller, J. P. Morgan and Cornelius Vanderbilt II. Ashbel P. Fitch was a member of the Ardsley Club upon his death in 1904. Founding members also included members of the Gould and Whitney families. According to author and club member Kate Buford, the club was "proof that two groups of society - the robber barons and old New York - would blend."  As of March 1896, the club's board of governors had 21 members, including John D. Archbold, Amzi Barber, Walston H. Brwn, William L. Bull, Frederick L. Eldridge, Samuel Goodman, Edwin Gould, E. G. Janeway, Cyrus Field Judson, William F. Judson, George H. Mairs, Major O. J. Smith, Philip Schuyler, General Samuel Thomas, John T. Terry, John T. Terry, Jr., Roderick Terry, Henry Villard, Charles C. Worthington, John Brisbain Walker, and Lucien Warner. Among other prominent members at the time were H. Walter Webb and Walter W. Law,.

Founding features
After the club was incorporated in 1895, the Ardsley Casino Clubhouse was finished in the spring of 1896 under the design of Goodhue Livingston of Trowbridge, Livingston & Colt, on a plot of 500 acres overlooking the Hudson River. The clubhouse had sleeping rooms on the upper floors to accommodate forty or fifty members, with several baths and a large swimming tank at 25 feet by 15 feet. The main floor had a large clubroom, card and billiard rooms, and a large dining room. A private railroad station was built below the clubhouse with express trains available.

Around 200 trees were felled to allow a clear drive to the property, with many of the logs used to bank up the sides of a golf course. Architect Willie Dunn oversaw all aspects of the golf course's development.  Founding attractions included golf, polo, tennis, and space for the anchoring of yachts.

It had a pool for swimming. Members would play the new sports of tennis and golf from the beginning, of both genders. According to Buford, the club was set apart from other smaller clubs by "a massive, hotel-like clubhouse and spectacular golf course. It was a symbol of the gilded age." Contemporaries included Knollwood in Elmsford, founded a year before Ardsley, and Bonnie Briar in Larchmont.

Early on, some members would sail from Manhattan up the Hudson river to dock their yachts in boat slips at the club. The club also arranged it so that the private train at Ardsley-on-Hudson, now Metro-North property, would match the style of the clubhouse. The clubhouse, now a cooperative known as Hudson House, was of a neo-Elizabethan style.

In 1898, the club held the opening of the Women's National Golf Championship Tournament. By noon on October 11, around 1,000 persons were present at the match.

Modern years
It became an increasingly family club in the 1930s. Between 1935 and 1965, many of the club's members and their families lived in the nearby Ardsley Park area.

In 1935, many of the old furnishings were sold for low prices at auction. The original Ardsley clubhouse and grounds, once assessed at $850,000, was at the time being foreclosed on for a mortgage of $350,000, with the expectation that the clubhouse would be razed and the property used for country homes.

By June 1966, it had 60 members under president Edwin L. Sibert Jr. In 1966, three new curling rinks were planned at the Ardsley Country Club. As of 1995, membership of the club played tennis and golf, swam, and attended social events on the same site. It had 450 member families, with president Harvey Appelle.

Buildings and their design
According to author Frank E. Sanchis, Ardsley Country Club was "one of the grandest country clubs ever built."

Further reading
From Hudson to Hilltop: The First 100 Years of the Ardsley Country Club by Kate Buford

References

Buildings and structures in New York (state)
Golf clubs and courses in New York (state)
Sports venues in New York (state)
Sports organizations established in 1895
Sports venues completed in 1896
1895 establishments in New York (state)
Clubs and societies in New York (state)